The 1976 NCAA Division II basketball tournament involved 32 schools playing in a single-elimination tournament to determine the national champion of men's NCAA Division II college basketball as a culmination of the 1975–76 NCAA Division II men's basketball season. It was won by the University of Puget Sound and Puget Sound's Curt Peterson was the Most Outstanding Player.

Regional participants

*denotes tie

Regionals

Great Lakes - Evansville, Indiana
Location: Roberts Municipal Stadium Host: University of Evansville

Third Place - Wright State 72, St. Joseph's 68

New England - Fairfield, Connecticut
Location: Alumni Hall Host: University of Bridgeport

Third Place - Bentley 83, Quinnipiac 77

South - Chattanooga, Tennessee
Location: Maclellan Gymnasium Host: University of Tennessee at Chattanooga

Third Place - Rollins 101, Florida Tech 91

South Central - Thibodeaux, Louisiana
Location: Stopher Gym Host: Nicholls State University

Third Place - Lincoln 86, Missouri-Rolla 84*

West - Tacoma, Washington
Location: Memorial Fieldhouse Host: University of Puget Sound

Third Place - Cal Poly Pomona 84, UC Davis 82*

North Central - Grand Forks, North Dakota
Location: Hyslop Sports Center Host: University of North Dakota

Third Place - Minnesota State 95, Nebraska-Omaha 73

South Atlantic - Norfolk, Virginia
Location: Norfolk Scope Host: Old Dominion University

Third Place - Morgan State 86, Madison 81

East - Villanova, Pennsylvania
Location: Villanova Field House Host: Philadelphia College of Textiles and Science

Third Place - Buffalo State 69, Hartwick 67

*denotes each overtime played

National Quarterfinals

National Finals - Evansville, Indiana
Location: Roberts Municipal Stadium Host: University of Evansville

Third Place - Eastern Illinois 78, Old Dominion 74

*denotes each overtime played

All-tournament team
 Jeff Fuhrmann (Old Dominion)
 Jeff Furry (Eastern Illinois)
 Brant Gibler (Puget Sound)
 Wayne Golden (Tennessee-Chattanooga)
 Curt Peterson (Puget Sound)

See also
1976 NCAA Division I basketball tournament
1976 NCAA Division III basketball tournament
1976 NAIA Basketball Tournament

References

Sources
 2010 NCAA Men's Basketball Championship Tournament Records and Statistics: Division II men's basketball Championship
 1976 NCAA Division II men's basketball tournament jonfmorse.com

NCAA Division II men's basketball tournament
Tournament
NCAA Division II basketball tournament
NCAA Division II basketball tournament